Guru Nanak Dev Engineering College may refer to:

 Guru Nanak Dev Engineering College, Ludhiana, in Punjab, India
 Guru Nanak Dev Engineering College, Bidar, in Karnataka, India